Parthia is a historical region located in northeastern Iran. 

Parthia may also refer to:
 Parthian Empire, an empire ruled by Parthians
 Parthia (horse), a thoroughbred racehorse
 Alternate form of Partita, a musical form
 Parthia, two ships of the Cunard Line
 Parthia (moth) a genus of moths in the family Pyralidae

See also
 Parthian (disambiguation)
 Pahlavi (disambiguation)